Pelzer Presbyterian Church is a historic Presbyterian church located at 13 Lebby Street in Pelzer, Anderson County, South Carolina. It was built in 1896, and is a rectangular Akron Plan church building with a gable front roof and sheathed in weatherboard. It features impressive stained and leaded glass windows and a Gothic arch entrance. A two-story, five-sided Sunday school classroom addition was built in 1905.

It was built in 1896 and added to the National Register in 1993.

References

External links

 Pelzer Presbyterian Church Historical Marker

Akron Plan church buildings
Presbyterian churches in South Carolina
Churches on the National Register of Historic Places in South Carolina
Carpenter Gothic church buildings in South Carolina
Churches completed in 1896
19th-century Presbyterian church buildings in the United States
Buildings and structures in Anderson County, South Carolina
National Register of Historic Places in Anderson County, South Carolina